Koggenland is a municipality in North Holland province  and the region of West-Frisia of the Netherlands. It came into existence on 1 January 2007 upon the merger of the two former municipalities of Obdam and Wester-Koggenland.

The name of the municipality refers to the historic Kogge from the middle-ages.  A kogge or cogge was a jurisdiction area of several villages or bannen (mostly around 4 or 5).

Population centres

Villages:

Hamlets:

Topography

Dutch topographic map of the municipality of Koggenland, July 2015

Notable people 

 Bernard Claesen Speirdyke (1663, prob. in Spierdijk – 1670) a 17th-century Dutch buccaneer  
 Jacob Clay (1882 in Berkhout – 1955) a Dutch physicist who studied cosmic rays 
 Henk Jonker (1912 in Berkhout – 2002) a Dutch photographer, most active in World War II
 Sander Lantinga (born 1976 in Biddinghuizen) a radio & TV program maker, a radio-DJ and streaker

Sport 
 Ron Vlaar (born 1985 in Hensbroek) a Dutch footballer with over 300 club caps
 Jetse Bol (born 1989 in Avenhorn) a professional Dutch road bicycle racer

Gallery

References

External links

Official website

 
Municipalities of North Holland
Municipalities of the Netherlands established in 2007